The Wings of Freedom Phoenix 103 is an American amateur-built ultralight aircraft that was produced by Wings of Freedom of Hubbard, Ohio. When it was available it was supplied as a kit for amateur construction.

In late 2019 the company website had been taken down and it is likely that production had ended.

Design and development
The Phoenix 103 is based on the discontinued Aero-Works Aerolite 103. It features a strut-braced high-wing, a single-seat open cockpit with windshield, fixed tricycle landing gear and a single engine in pusher configuration.

The aircraft is made from aluminum tubing, with its flying surfaces covered in Dacron sailcloth. Construction time is estimated at 100 hours.

Operational history
By December 2011, the manufacturer reported that ten of the aircraft had been completed and flown.

Specifications (Phoenix 103)

References

External links

Homebuilt aircraft
Single-engined pusher aircraft
2000s United States ultralight aircraft
Wings of Freedom aircraft